Dajiba Desai is an Indian politician. He was elected to the Lok Sabha, lower house of the Parliament of India from Kolhapur, Maharashtra as a member of the Peasants and Workers Party of India.

References

External links
  Official Biographical Sketch in Lok Sabha Website

India MPs 1977–1979
Peasants and Workers Party of India politicians
Lok Sabha members from Maharashtra
Rajya Sabha members from Maharashtra
1925 births
1985 deaths
Marathi politicians
People from Kolhapur
People from Belagavi district